Taylor Airport , also known as Taylor Municipal Airport, is a public airport located  southwest of the central business district of Taylor, a city in Navajo County, Arizona, United States.

References

External links 
 Taylor Municipal Airport (TYL) at Arizona DOT airport directory
 

Airports in Navajo County, Arizona